Stephen Kilcar Ritchie (born 17 February 1954) is a Scottish former footballer. Ritchie played for Bristol City, Greenock Morton, Hereford United, Aberdeen, Torquay United and Yeovil Town. He scored a goal for Aberdeen in the 1978 Scottish Cup Final, but the team lost 2–1 to the Rangers. Ritchie mis-hit a shot, but it deceived Rangers goalkeeper Peter McCloy.

References

External links

1954 births
Living people
Footballers from Edinburgh
Scottish footballers
Association football fullbacks
Bristol City F.C. players
Greenock Morton F.C. players
Hereford United F.C. players
Aberdeen F.C. players
Torquay United F.C. players
Yeovil Town F.C. players
English Football League players
Scottish Football League players